Joseph G. Glaser (December 17, 1896 – June 6, 1969) was an artist manager known for his involvement in the careers of jazz musicians, including Louis Armstrong and Billie Holiday.

Biography
Glaser was the son of a Chicago family of Russian Jewish origins. After a series of irregular jobs (fight promoter, club manager), with the help of his alleged mob connections he started managing Louis Armstrong in May 1935. The success of their association caused other jazz musicians to join Glaser and his agency known as the Associated Booking Corporation which "was formed in 1940 by Joe Glaser and Louis Armstrong". The relation of Glaser and Armstrong has been represented as a prominent element in Terry Teachout's theater play Satchmo at the Waldorf.

Although his clients had a high opinion of him , Glaser was a feared person in the business industry. Associated Booking Corporation, or "ABC" as it is also known, was incorporated on June 26, 1943, and is still in existence today. It has represented Duke Ellington, Benny Goodman, Lionel Hampton, Woody Herman, Dave Brubeck, Barbra Streisand, B.B. King, The Allman Brothers Band, T. Rex, The Platters and many others.

Death
Glaser died on June 6, 1969, at Mount Sinai Beth Israel Hospital in New York City after suffering a stroke. He was 72.

FBI file
After his death in 1969, Glaser's FBI file – CR 166-1672 – was shipped over to the H.R. Select Committee On Assassinations sometime in 1976–1979. While the file was sent to the committee in the belief that Glaser had known Jack 'Sparky' Rubenstein (better known as Jack Ruby) from his Chicago days, that file revealed that Glaser was still doing some boxing promotion as late as 1966, representing Ernie Terrell in his 1966 boxing match against the then Cassius Clay. He was key to the career of Clarence Avant.

References

Further reading 
 Bergreen, Laurence, "Louis Armstrong: An Extravagant Life". 1997 
 Holiday, Billie and Dufty, William, "Lady sings the blues". 1956 

American music managers
American people of Russian-Jewish descent
1896 births
1969 deaths